2 Jennifer is a 2016 indie horror film written and directed by Hunter Johnson, who also stars in the film. The film is a sequel to James Cullen Bressack's To Jennifer and features Johnson as a young man intent on creating a sequel to the 2013 film. The film also features David Coupe and Lara Jean Mummert.

Synopsis
Spencer wants to create a sequel to one of his favorite horror films, To Jennifer, and is hoping that doing so will launch his career as a filmmaker. As such, he is playing one of the movie's main characters and wants to find the perfect woman to serve as the film's titular character, even going so far as to insist that they only consider actresses that are named Jennifer. However as they find their perfect Jennifer and filming commences, Spencer's hold on reality grows more and more tenuous.

Cast
Hunter Johnson as Spencer
David Coupe as Mack
Lara Jean Mummert as Jennifer
Felissa Rose as Jennifer Smith
Erin Marie Hogan as Jennifer Johnson
Veronica Ricci as Jennifer Martin
Jody Barton as Jody
James Cullen Bressack as James
Jarrett Furst as Jarrett
Josh Brown as Josh
Charles Chudabala as Charlie
Matt Holbrook as Dennis
Chrissy Cannone as Susan
Marv Blauvelt as Thumper
Erin Killean as Jennifer Corby

Reception
Starburst wrote a favorable review of the film, as they felt that it was "refreshing to have a sequel work so well and for it actually not be essential that one has seen the original. Ultimately, it’s a more enjoyable ride than the first, with a payoff that packs quite a wallop."

In contrast, Dread Central panned 2 Jennifer, stating that "Fans of bargain-basement snuff will eat this one right up, but for this lad, I prefer to keep my eyesight on level ground… solid, stable, non-shaky ground."

References

External links
 

Found footage films
American horror films
2016 horror films
2010s English-language films
2010s American films
English-language horror films